86P/Wild (pronounced 86P/Vilt) is a periodic comet in the Solar System with a current orbital period of 6.84 years. 

It was discovered on photographic plates exposed on 11/12 April 1980 by Paul Wild of the Astronomical Institute of University of Bern, Switzerland at the nearby Zimmerwald Observatory. He reported the brightness at a magnitude of 15.5 and that the comet was diffuse. He rediscovered it on 7 May 1980 and calculations by Brian G. Marsden estimated that perihelion would take place on 6 October 1980. 

Syuichi Nakano calculated the next perihelion would be 31 August 1987 and the comet was duly observed by Tom Gehrels and J. V. Scotti on the Spacewatch telescope at Kitt Peak Observatory, Arizona, USA. Perihelion was 1 September. 

The same team re-observed it in 1994 with a faint brightness of magnitude 21. It has since been observed in 2001, 2008 and 2015.

See also
 List of numbered comets

References
 

Periodic comets
0086
 
Comets in 2015
Astronomical objects discovered in 1980